Putyvl or Putivl is a city in Sumy Oblast, in north-east Ukraine. The city served as the administrative center of Putyvl Raion until the administrative reform in 2018l it is now under the jurisdiction of Konotop Raion. Population:

History
One of the original Siverian towns, Putyvl was first mentioned as early as 1146 as an important fortress contested between Chernihiv and Novhorod-Siverskyi principalities of Kievan Rus. The song of Yaroslavna on the walls of Putyvl is the emotional culmination of the medieval Lay of Igor's Campaign and Alexander Borodin's opera Prince Igor.

After the Battle of Vedrosha in 1500, Putyvl was ceded to Muscovite Russia. During the Time of Troubles, the town became the center of Ivan Bolotnikov's uprising and briefly a base for the False Dmitry I forces. It was occupied by Polish–Lithuanian Commonwealth between 1607 and 1619.

Putyvl was part of Kursk guberniya of the Russian Empire prior to the Bolshevik Revolution. It was part of Ukrainian SSR on 16 October 1925. During the Second World War Soviet partisans led by Sydir Kovpak started their guerrilla war against the Germans in the forests all over the Northern Ukraine. It was under German occupation between 10 September 1941 and 3 September 1943.

During the 2022 Russian invasion, Russian troops occupied the city during their offensive towards Konotop.

Architecture

The main architectural monument of Putivl is the Molchansky Monastery, which dates largely to the 17th century. The foundations of its three-domed cathedral, dedicated to the Nativity of the Theotokos, belong to the 1590s, but the main part of the church is one of the earliest Baroque structures in the region, described in its entirety by Paul of Aleppo in 1654. The cathedral displays strong influence of Muscovite architecture, especially in detailing and sculptural decor.

Apart from the monastery, Putyvl also possesses the Cossack Baroque church of St. Nicholas (1735–37) and the Saviour Cathedral, a singular hybrid of Ukrainian and Russian church architecture, started in 1617 and incorporating such typically Muscovite features as onion domes. Remaining parts of 17th-century fortifications are visible close at hand; these include the gates and several towers, one of which was built up into a belltower in 1700.

Gallery

References

External links 
 Informal city portal

Cities in Sumy Oblast
Putivlsky Uyezd
Kiev Voivodeship
Cities of district significance in Ukraine